The 1949 St. John's Redmen baseball team represented the St. John's University in the 1949 NCAA baseball season. The Redmen played their home games at Dexter Park. The team was coached by Frank McGuire in his St. John's University in his 2nd year at St. John's.

The Redmen won the Region A to advance to the College World Series, where they were defeated by the Southern California Trojans.

Roster

Schedule

References 

St. John's Red Storm baseball seasons
St. John's Redmen baseball
College World Series seasons
St. John's Redmen